Helicopter dynamics is a field within aerospace engineering concerned with theoretical and practical aspects of helicopter flight. Its comprises helicopter aerodynamics, stability, control, structural dynamics, vibration, and aeroelastic and aeromechanical stability.

By studying the forces in helicopter flight, improved helicopter designs can be made. In 2013, stereophotogrammetry was used to measure the dynamics of a Robinson R44 helicopter during the hover.

See also
 Flight dynamics (aircraft)
 Disc loading
 Rotordynamics

References

Aerospace engineering
Helicopters